Marcus Helvécio Martins (born 22 April 1959) is the former dean and department chair for religious education at Brigham Young University–Hawaii (BYU–Hawaii), and also the author of Setting the Record Straight: Blacks and the Mormon Priesthood.  Martins was the first black member to serve as a missionary after the revelation extending the priesthood of the Church of Jesus Christ of Latter-day Saints (LDS Church) to all male members regardless of race or color. Martins is the son of Helvécio Martins, the first Latter-day Saint of African descent to serve as an LDS Church general authority.

Early years and career
Marcus Helvécio Martins was born in Rio de Janeiro, Brazil, and became an American citizen in 2010. In the 1970s and 80s in Brazil, Martins worked as a construction inspector and later as a systems analyst.  Martins then went to Provo, Utah, where he studied for six years at Brigham Young University (BYU), earning degrees in business management, organizational behavior, and a Ph.D. in Sociology.  During his doctoral work, he was a part-time Religion and Sociology instructor at BYU, and later worked as a religion professor at then-Ricks College (now BYU–Idaho), before taking a position at BYU–Hawaii in 2000.  As a department chair, associate dean, and dean of religious education at BYU–Hawaii, he put forth initiatives to enhance religious education through the use of educational technology and public relations.  He also served as chair of the Faculty Advisory Council (akin to a faculty senate), and member of the strategic planning and academic planning committees.  He was the first BYU–Hawaii professor to work closely with BYU Television (BYUtv) in taking academic lectures to an international audience. In 2002, he was elected “Teacher of the Year” by BYU–Hawaii's President's Council, and in 2017 he was elected “Honored Professor of the Year” by BYU–Hawaii's Honors Council.

He has spoken to professional and ecclesiastical audiences throughout the United States, Brazil, and Japan, and participated in professional conferences in China, Hong Kong, Malaysia, Singapore, the U.K., and Qatar. He participated in the documentary “Messiah: Behold the Lamb of God”, broadcast on BYUtv. He has several video lectures on religion-related topics on his YouTube channel, and in 2016 began speaking in online multi-stake devotionals internationally, along with frequent informal online chats on doctrine with audiences worldwide.  He has also participated in podcasts, interviews, and articles to the media. Among his topics of interest are: strategic management in a global environment, computer technology, law, politics, and world languages and cultures.  His research focuses on temple symbolism, and the impact of globalization forces, technology, and immigration on the growth of the LDS Church, as well as consequences of the doctrines of the restoration on daily religiosity.

In 2007, Martins published the book “Setting the Record Straight: Blacks and the Mormon Priesthood” and in 2017 he wrote the manuscript “The Priesthood: Earthly Symbols and Heavenly Realities”.

Family and church service 
Martins and his parents joined the LDS Church in 1972.  In 1978, Marcus Martins became engaged to Mirian Abelin Barbosa, who had just returned from serving in the church's Brazil São Paulo South Mission.  Initially they planned on getting married in May 1978, but then planned to postpone the marriage until after the dedication of the São Paulo Brazil Temple, so she could be sealed to her parents at the same time.  However, she then decided not to follow that plan and they set a new marriage date of August 5.  On June 8, 1978, Official Declaration—2 was announced.  After much contemplation and prayer, and with Mirian's support, Martins decided to postpone the wedding so he could serve a mission.  He served in the Brazil São Paulo North Mission from 1978 to 1980. After returning from his mission, he married Mirian on December 19, 1980.

Over the years, Martins has served in the LDS Church twice as a bishop (in Brazil and Hawaii), seven times as a high councilor, and as a temple ordinance worker, among other positions. In the early 1980s, he participated in a new translation of the Book of Mormon into Portuguese. From 2011 to 2014, he was president of the Brazil São Paulo North Mission, the same mission he had served in as a young missionary.

Notes

References

External links 
 Marcus H. Martins' personal website
Marcus H. Martins, "Forty Years After the 40th Year: Expectations for the Future of Black Members in the Church of Jesus Christ of Latter-day Saints", presented at Brigham Young University's Neal A. Maxwell Institute for Religious Scholarship's conference "40 Years: Commemorating the 1978 Priesthood and Temple Revelation", 2018-10-12
 Marcus H. Martins, "Forty Years After 126 Years: Reflections from an Aging Black Man in Zion", presented at the University of Utah's Tanner Humanities Center's “Black, White, and Mormon II”: A Conference on Race in the LDS Church Since the 1978, 2018-06-30
 Marcus H. Martins, "The Doctrine of the Priesthood and Gender Issues", presented at Brigham Young University's Religion Faculty Forum, 2016-02-25
 Marcus H. Martins,  "Thirty Years After the 'Long Promised Day': Reflections and Expectations", presented at the Orem Utah Institute of Religion, 2008-02-29
 Martins on YouTube, Dr. Martins' YouTube Channel

1959 births
Brazilian leaders of the Church of Jesus Christ of Latter-day Saints
Brazilian Mormon missionaries
Brigham Young University alumni
Brigham Young University–Hawaii faculty
Brigham Young University–Idaho faculty
English–Portuguese translators
Mormon missionaries in Brazil
Mormonism and race
Living people
Brazilian academics
Brazilian male writers
American Latter Day Saint writers
20th-century Mormon missionaries
Brazilian emigrants to the United States
Black Mormons
Mission presidents (LDS Church)
21st-century Mormon missionaries
Translators of the Book of Mormon
20th-century translators
21st-century translators
Missionary linguists